The Fleet Half Marathon is an annual road running event held in Fleet, Hampshire, United Kingdom. It is organised by Fleet & Crookham AC and is currently sponsored by ASICS.

The race is branded as the 'Pre-London' half marathon due to its location in the running calendar prior to the London Marathon. However, in 2018 due to snow the event was cancelled and eventually took place a week after the London Marathon.

Past winners

References

External links
 Official website

Half marathons in the United Kingdom
Recurring sporting events established in 1982